Louisiana has 13.8 million acres of forestlands covering approximately 48% of the total state area. The majority (62%) is owned by private, non-industrial landowners, forest industries own 29% and 9% are public lands. The Louisiana Department of Agriculture and Forestry (LDAF), Office of Forestry, is tasked with timberland wildfire suppression. and the state maintain eight district headquarters with seventeen divisions and many substations or yards.

History
By Act 113 the Louisiana legislature created the Department of Forestry in 1904. The Department of Conservation was created by Act 144 in 1908. In 1915 funds were directed for fire protection work allowing the hiring of lookout watchmen or patrolmen. In 1917 public education for fire prevention work began. In 1922 the first steel fire tower was built near Bogalusa on Great Southern Lumber Company land. In 1923 the second tower was built near Urania. Prior to these two towers rungs were nailed to a pine tree with a perch erected near the top. By 1943 thirty-nine fire towers had been built and by 1950 the number had increased to fifty-six.

List of fire towers
Many fire towers still exist with the majority being inactive but many are maintained in reserve. 

Notes: Towers on the National Historic Lookout Register (NHLR)

References

General references
Central US lookouts
Louisiana towers

Fire lookout towers in the United States
Wildfire suppression
State agencies of Louisiana
Forestry agencies in the United States
Towers in Louisiana